Lloyd W. "Fig" Newton (born December 24, 1942) is a retired United States Air Force (USAF) four-star general who served as Commander, Air Education and Training Command (COMAETC) from 1997 to 2000. He was also the first African-American pilot in the U.S. Air Force Thunderbirds.

Newton was born in Ridgeland, South Carolina, where he graduated from Jasper High School. He earned a Bachelor of Science degree in aviation education from Tennessee State University in Nashville, where he was commissioned as a distinguished graduate through the Air Force Reserve Officer Training Corps program in 1966.

After completing pilot training at Williams Air Force Base, Arizona, in June 1967, he attended F-4D Phantom qualification training at George Air Force Base, California. He flew 269 combat missions from Da Nang Air Base, South Vietnam, including 79 missions over North Vietnam. Newton was selected to join the USAF Air Demonstration Squadron, the Thunderbirds, in November 1974. He held several positions including narrator, slot pilot and right wingman. From 1978 to 1982 he was assigned as a USAF congressional liaison officer with the U.S. House of Representatives, Washington, D.C. He has commanded three wings and an air division, and held numerous staff positions. From 1993 to 1995 he was director of operations, J-3, United States Special Operations Command. Newton was a command pilot with more than 4,000 flying hours in the T-37, T-38, F-4, F-15, F-16, C-12 and F-117 stealth fighter.

In 2000 Newton joined Pratt & Whitney as the Vice President of Business Development (Military Engines), a position that he held until 2006.

In 2008 Newton endorsed Barack Obama for president and appeared on stage at the Democratic National Convention at Invesco Field with other former military leaders to lend support to Obama's campaign.

Education
 1966 Bachelor of Science degree in aviation education, Tennessee State University, Nashville
 1978 Armed Forces Staff College, Norfolk, Virginia
 1985 Industrial College of the Armed Forces, Washington, D.C.
 1985 Master of Arts degree in public administration, George Washington University, Washington, D.C.
 1987 National Security Senior Executives Course, Harvard University, Massachusetts

Assignments and promotions
 Commissioned as a second lieutenant March 23, 1966
 June 1966 – June 1967, pilot training, Williams Air Force Base, Arizona
 June 1967 – April 1968, F-4D qualification training, George Air Force Base, California
 Promoted to first lieutenant December 12, 1967
 April 1968 – April 1969, F-4D pilot and systems operator, Da Nang Air Base, South Vietnam
 April–November 1969, F-4D upgrade qualification training, George Air Force Base, California
 Promoted to captain June 12, 1969
 November 1969 – November 1973, F-4D pilot, 523rd Tactical Fighter Squadron, Clark Air Base, Philippines
 November 1973 – November 1974, F-4D flight instructor pilot, Luke Air Force Base, Arizona
 November 1974 – February 1978, narrator and slot pilot, U.S. Air Force Thunderbirds, Nellis Air Force Base, Nevada
 February–June 1978, student, Armed Forces Staff College, Norfolk, Virginia
 Promoted to major January 1, 1978
 June–December 1978, right wingman and narrator, U.S. Air Force Thunderbirds, Nellis Air Force Base, Nevada
 December 1978 – February 1982, congressional liaison officer, U.S. House of Representatives, Washington, D.C.
 Promoted to lieutenant colonel October 1, 1980
 February–June 1982, F-16 qualification training, MacDill Air Force Base, Florida
 June 1982 – June 1983, assistant deputy commander for operations, 8th Tactical Fighter Wing, Kunsan Air Base, South Korea
 June 1983 – August 1984, assistant deputy commander for operations, 388th Tactical Fighter Wing, Hill Air Force Base, Utah
 Promoted to colonel December 1, 1983
 August 1984 – August 1985, student, Industrial College of the Armed Forces, Washington, D.C.
 August 1985 – November 1986, assistant deputy director for operations and training, Headquarters U.S. Air Force, Washington, D.C.
 November 1986 – July 1988, assistant director of special projects, directorate of plans, Headquarters U.S. Air Force, Washington, D.C.
 July 1988 – May 1989, commander, 71st Air Base Group, Vance Air Force Base, Oklahoma
 May 1989 – May 1990, commander, 71st Flying Training Wing, Vance Air Force Base, Oklahoma
 May 1990 – August 1991, commander, 12th Flying Training Wing, Randolph Air Force Base, Texas
 Promoted to brigadier general August 3, 1991
 August–November 1991, commander, 833rd Air Division, Holloman Air Force Base, New Mexico
 November 1991 – July 1993, commander, 49th Fighter Wing, Holloman Air Force Base, New Mexico
 July 1993 – May 1995, director of operations, J-3, United States Special Operations Command, MacDill Air Force Base, Florida
 Promoted to major general August 10, 1993
 Promoted to lieutenant general May 25, 1995
 June 1995 – March 1997, assistant vice chief of staff, Headquarters U.S. Air Force, Washington, D.C.
 March 1997 – 2000, commander, Headquarters Air Education and Training Command, Randolph Air Force Base, Texas
 Promoted to general April 1, 1997

Flight information
 Rating: Command pilot
 Flight hours: More than 4,000
 Aircraft flown: T-37, T-38, F-4, F-15, F-16, F-117 and C-12
 Pilot wings from: Williams Air Force Base, Arizona

Major awards and decorations
   Defense Distinguished Service Medal
   Air Force Distinguished Service Medal with oak leaf cluster
   Legion of Merit with oak leaf cluster
   Distinguished Flying Cross with oak leaf cluster
   Meritorious Service Medal with oak leaf cluster
   Air Medal with 16 oak leaf clusters
   Air Force Commendation Medal
   Air Force Outstanding Unit Award with "V" device and two oak leaf clusters
   Vietnam Service Medal
   Philippine Presidential Unit Citation
   Republic of Vietnam Campaign Medal

Other achievements
 1997 Honorary doctorate in aeronautical science, Embry-Riddle Aeronautical University, Daytona Beach, Florida
 1999 Honorary doctor of science degree, Benedict College, Columbia, South Carolina
 International Air and Space Hall of Fame (2018)

References

External links

1942 births
Living people
United States Air Force generals
United States Air Force Thunderbirds pilots
Recipients of the Distinguished Flying Cross (United States)
Recipients of the Legion of Merit
Tennessee State University alumni

Harvard University alumni
United States Air Force personnel of the Vietnam War
People from Ridgeland, South Carolina
African-American United States Air Force personnel
Recipients of the Air Medal

Recipients of the Defense Distinguished Service Medal
Recipients of the Air Force Distinguished Service Medal

21st-century African-American people
African Americans in the Vietnam War
20th-century African-American people